Eubranchus echizenicus is a species of sea slug or nudibranch, a marine gastropod mollusc in the family Eubranchidae.

Distribution
This species was described from the Echizen Coast, Japan. It has been reported from Hachijo Islands and Omijima, Yamaguchi Prefecture, Japan, and possibly Moreton Bay, Queensland, Australia.

References

Eubranchidae
Gastropods described in 1975